Pálmi Gestsson (born 2 October 1957) is an Icelandic actor and voice actor. He is known for the long-running Icelandic sketch group Spaugstofan which he co-created. Among his voice acting is the Icelandic voice of Shere Khan in The Jungle Book.

Early life 
Pálmi was born in 1957 in Bolungarvík, the Westfjords, Iceland.

Career 
Pálmi graduated from the Icelandic Drama School in 1982. He has been working with the National Theatre of Iceland since 1983.

Personal life 
Pálmi is a nature lover and once walked up 52 mountains (1 per week) in a year in Iceland. He likes hunting birds and especially reindeer which is one of his favorite foods.

He is married to Sigurlaug Halldórsdóttir, a stewardess, and has 4 children.

Selected filmography
 Bíódagar (1994) as Truck Driver
 Benjamín Dúfa (1995) as Andrés's father
 Einglar Alheimsins (2000) as Vilhjálmur
 Njálssaga (2003) as Þráinn
 Afinn (2014) as Lárus
 Þrestir (2015) as Diddi
 Ófærð (2015-2016) (TV-series) as Hrafn Eysteinsson
 Agnes Joy (2019)

External links

References 

20th-century Icelandic male actors
21st-century Icelandic male actors
Icelandic male voice actors
Living people
1957 births